A list of films produced in France in 1942.

See also
 1942 in France

References

External links
 French films of 1942 at the Internet Movie Database
French films of 1942 at Cinema-francais.fr

1942
Films
French